Twin Lakes are two small lakes located northeast of North Wilmurt, New York.

References 

Lakes of Herkimer County, New York
Lakes of New York (state)